Bartok or Bartók is a surname. Notable people with the surname include:

Béla Bartók (1881–1945), Hungarian composer
Eva Bartok (1927–1998), Hungarian actress

Fictional characters:
Anton Bartok, character in the film The Fly II
Janos Bartok, character in the science fiction Western TV series Legend
Bartok, character in the film Last Knights
Josef Bartok, character in a 2021 film adaptation of The Royal Game

Hungarian-language surnames